The 2015–16 Under-21 Premier League Cup (known as the Barclays Under-21 Premier League Cup for sponsorship reasons) is the third edition of the U21 Premier League Cup. The competition was won by West Ham United who defeated Hull City 5–3 in a penalty shoot-out after the two-leg final had finished 1–1 on aggregate.

Participants 
There was one more participant than the previous competition.

Category 1

Category 2

Category 3

Matches

First qualifying round
This round commences the week beginning 14 September 2015. Peterborough United received a bye.

Northern Section

Southern Section

† – After extra time

Second qualifying round
This round commences the week beginning 5 October 2015. Leeds United were awarded a bye.

Northern Section

Southern Section

† – After extra time

Round of 32
This round begins the week beginning 9 November 2015. The Category 1 sides were joined in this round by the teams progressing from the Second Qualifying round.

Northern Section

Southern Section

† – After extra time.

Round of 16
This round begins the week beginning 21 December 2015.

† – After extra time.

Quarter-finals

† – After extra time.

Semi-finals

† – After extra time.

Final

First leg

Second leg

See also
 2015–16 Professional U21 Development League
 2015–16 FA Cup
 2015–16 FA Youth Cup
 2015–16 in English football

References 

Premier League Cup (football)
Under-21